KBNA may refer to:

 The ICAO code for Nashville International Airport
 KBNA-FM, a radio station (97.5 FM) licensed to El Paso, Texas, United States
 KQBU (AM), a radio station (920 AM) licensed to El Paso, Texas, United States, which used the call sign KBNA from December 2004 to December 2007